Suan Gye clan is one of the Korean clans. Their Bon-gwan is in Suan County, North Hwanghae Province. According to the research held in 2015, the number of Suan Gye clan’s member was 6056. Their founder was  who was from Ming dynasty and was naturalized in Joseon. When he worked as the Ministry of Rites (Lǐbù), he was dispatched to teach Li (Confucianism) because of Hongwu Emperor’s order. After  was naturalized, he became Prince of Suan and founded Suan Gye clan.

See also 
 Korean clan names of foreign origin

References

External links 
 

 
Korean clan names of Chinese origin
Gye clans